Arpaliq (also Romanized as Ārpālīq; also known as Ārpālīkh) is a village in Qarah Quyun-e Shomali Rural District, in the Central District of Showt County, West Azerbaijan Province, Iran. At the 2006 census, its population was 103, across 22 families.

References 

Populated places in Showt County